Bunty Aur Billy (also known as Bunty and Billy, Billy & Birdy, Bunty Billa Aur Babban or Cat & Keet) is an Indian animated comedy television series produced by Toonz Media Group. The show follows the daily exploits of Cat, an orange cat and his love-hate relationship with a parakeet that lives with him in the house, named Keet.

Plot 

Cat and Keet chronicles the antics of Cat and Keet, a pair of animals who live together in the same house. They usually spend their time trying to outsmart one another. While Cat is presented as sly, conniving, and manipulative, Keet's carefree, intelligent and crafty persona causes the duo to envy one another, and the episodes feature them doing battle in numerous, often violent ways. Despite their differences, they often team up to achieve a goal, and share a love-hate relationship. Other characters include Dunks, a blue donkey, Rosie, his love interest, and Koki and Koka, a hen and a rooster respectively.

Cast 
 Cat aka Billa, the orange cat.
 Keet aka Bunty Pehelwaan, the parrot.
 Dunks aka Babban Bhai, the blue donkey.
 Sethji, an old man.
 Hoodie aka Kallu, the black crow.
 Marco aka Moti, the German shepherd dog.
 Polo aka Paplu, the potcake dog and son of Moti.
 Rosie, the grey donkey who is a love interest of Dunks.
 Koki, the hen.
 Koka, the rooster.
 Katreena, the pink cat.
 Mala, Sethji's wife.
 Guddu, a baby.

Series overview

Episodes list

Season 1 (2015–2016) 
 The Yogi
 Itching
 Babysitting
 Haunted House
 Cook Bunty
 Wet Billy
 Swimming
 Coco Jumbo
 Party
 Katreena
 Harvest Attik
 Safari
 Kites
 Treekers Paradise
 Badminton
 Sick Dunky
 Dunky's Day In
 Bird House
 Cool Party
 Decorations
 Viola
 Another Intro

Season 2 (2016–2017) 

 Drought Again!
 Stop that Bandit!
 The Big Beach Battle
 Tall Tail Tales
 Silly Cat!
 Para and Keet
 The Mysterious Guest
 To Catch a Parakeet
 Mr. Know It All
 Dunky Needs a New House
 Fake Romance: Keet finds that Cat is in a love triangle, he loves a female cat named Katreena who isn't interested in him. Keet volunteers to help him with his dilemma by putting him through an excruciatingly painful exercise session.
 Packin' Up the Stuff
 Adabra vs Cat
 Cat and Keet meet King VBeard
 The Fight of Remote Control
 Hopples the Hopper Ball Bunny
 City's Got Talent
 Mouse in the Houss
 Pablo Pawcasso
 Happy Burpday
 Holiday Gone Wrong
 A Big Trick
 Electrified!
 The Champion of the City
 Dunky the Little Blue Donkey Doll
 Cat the Terrible Magician
 A Book for Keet
 Science with Neighbors
 Friend or Foe
 Coco or No Coco?

Season 3 (2017–2018) 

 Cock-a-Doodle Doo: When an over-protective and aggressive rooster named Koka shows up, Keet uses him to his advantage to protect himself and Koka's girlfriend, Koki, from Cat.
 Crystal Cupid
 Pizza Mania
 Cricket Mania
 Hill Station
 Ding Dong
 Party Time
 Macho Man 
 Level Up
 Grab a Crab
 Hammock Rekax
 Blue Alian
 Zooper Man
 Treasure Hunt
 Ninja Cats Defeat
 Christmas Chills
 Cookkie Jar
 Talent Show
 A Parrot
 Sick of It
 Street Cats
 Snake Charmer
 Mission Bunty
 Upser
 Paintastic
 Mouse
 Bad-time
 Bag Puplu

Season 4 (2018–2019) 

 Math Cat
 Six Pack
 The Rose
 Buckle
 The Garden
 Disums
 Showtime
 Chase
 Just A Hard Dats Work
 Froggy Day
 Froggy Friends
 The Boox
 The Book
 The Little Mermaid
 Out Of Town
 Kidnap Mayhem
 Wedding
 Fair Model
 Rocking Chair
 Back Home
 Mango Season
 Holiday Hills
 Ghost Mansion
 The Robber
 Mysteeios
 Wrestle: Keet enters Cat into a wrestling match, but Cat is rather reluctant to join.
 Fly In
 Neigpering Dog
 First Come First High
 Harvest Attack
 Horror Movie
 Unclean Teeth 
 Cryistmas
 Pizza Time
 Operation
 Scary
 Out Of Town 2
 Fly Me To The Moon

Season 5 (2019) 

 The Feast
 The Carrot
 Lunch Munch
 Museum
 The Magic Wand
 Doctor
 Big Snore
 Broken Bones
 Movies
 Double Role
 Small Ride
 Mandedamaded
 Aligning
 The Egg
 Cricket
 Mess at The Museum
 Honey Bees Attack
 Super Cat
 The Robo Maid
 Out of Town 3
 Bear and the Honey
 Nice Woonden
 Lollipop

Season 6 (2019–2020)

 Fun in the Sun
 TV Wars
 Sumo Cat
 Speed Stapoo
 Dolohin Tales
 Farm Family
 Golden Eggs
 Park
 Muffin Delight
 Party 2
 Shoot A Pic
 The New Year
 Plunger
 Live Poo
 For You
 An Alien Visit
 Hide and Go Freaak
 Cute Cat
 Mummy!
 Favorite
 Chant I Say
 Indian Cats
 "Kitty"
 Magic
 Painter Boys
 Up The Hill
 The Trick For You
 Magic Tricks
 Booom!
 Ailen Visit
 Movie Time
 Ly Sofa
 Veggietrouble
 Old Car
 Spider
 Secret Fort
 Namgo Seaakn 2
 Mango Season 2
 Mango Season 3
 Spider 2

External links
IMDB Cat & Keet (2015– ) TV Series   |  7 min   |  Animation

Indian children's animated comedy television series